Monika Sprüth is a German art dealer, co-owner of Sprüth Magers in Berlin and London, along with Philomene Magers.

Originally an architect and an artist, Sprüth opened her first gallery in Cologne in 1983.

In 2014, The Guardian named her in their "Movers and makers: the most powerful people in the art world". With Philomene Magers, she founded Galerie Sprüth Magers in 1998, based in Berlin, London, and Los Angeles, which, in addition to the aforementioned artists, represents John Baldessari, Cyprien Gaillard, Donald Judd, and Joseph Kosuth, among others.

References

Living people
German art dealers
Women art dealers
Recipients of the Order of Merit of Berlin
Year of birth missing (living people)